Coal commission or Coal Commission may refer to:

Coal Commission (United Kingdom), a UK government agency to manage coal reserves between 1938 and 1947
Coal commission (Germany) (Commission on Growth, Structural Change and Employment), a German government commission between 2018 and 2019

See also
Federal Coal Commission